Detius Muni (born 29 April 1994) is an Indonesian footballer who currently plays for Perseru Serui in Liga 1 as a defender.

References

External links

Detius Muni official website ISC

Indonesian footballers
1994 births
Living people
Perseru Serui players
Perseru Serui
Badak Lampung F.C. players
Liga 1 (Indonesia) players
Association football defenders